The 2021 Tour de France was the 108th edition of Tour de France, one of cycling's Grand Tours. The Tour began in Brest, France on 26 June, and Stage 12 from Saint-Paul-Trois-Châteaux to Nîmes occurred on 8 July. The race finished on the Champs-Élysées in Paris on 18 July.

Classification standings

Stage 12 
8 July 2021 – Saint-Paul-Trois-Châteaux to Nîmes, 

The undulating course featured only one categorized climb on the route, the third-category Côte du Belvédère de Tharaux, after , and one intermediate sprint in Uzès with around  left. Much like on stage 10, there was a threat of crosswinds along the way.

Before the stage, Peter Sagan abandoned the race due to his recurring knee injury. Immediately from the start, the peloton set a furious pace that began to form echelons, with the peloton being split into three groups and all the GC contenders making it into the first group. Most notable of them was the world champion, Julian Alaphilippe, who made the break for the second consecutive day. The break immediately extended their advantage, and without any teams chasing behind, it became almost certain that the break would go all the way and contest for the stage win. 

With  to go, Nils Politt attacked with Connor Swift, but the move was chased down. A few kilometres later, Politt attacked again, this time with Stefan Küng, Harry Sweeny, and Imanol Erviti. The quartet gradually built up their advantage over the rest of their breakaway companions.  from the finish, Sweeny launched an acceleration that dropped Küng. With  left, Politt was once again on the attack, this time with no response from Erviti and Sweeny. On the downhill run-in to the finish, Politt extended his lead to win his first Tour stage, 31 seconds ahead of Erviti and Sweeny. Küng finished seconds ahead of a group containing most of the other breakaway riders, with Luka Mezgec winning the sprint for fifth. Stefan Bissegger was the last of the breakaway members to finish, crossing the line by himself over five minutes behind Politt. About ten minutes after Bissegger, Mark Cavendish led the peloton home, sprinting for the few remaining points on offer to slightly extend his lead in the points classification. All the GC contenders finished safely in the peloton and the top ten remained unchanged.

Stage 13 
9 July 2021 – Nîmes to Carcassonne, 

The thirteenth stage saw the Tour continue west across southwestern France towards the Pyrenees. The undulating route ran roughly parallel to the Mediterranean coast, with crosswinds once again being a possibility. The first half of the stage featured both the day's only categorized climb and the intermediate sprint. Three uncategorized climbs preceded a flat run-in to the final kilometre, with a slight uphill drag to the finish line.

The break included Sean Bennett, Pierre Latour, and Omer Goldstein. After a while, Georg Zimmermann attempted to bridge from the peloton to the break, albeit unsuccessfully. The trio built a lead of two and a half minutes before the gap came down due to several riders attempting to bridge over to the break. Eventually,  took control at the front of the peloton, allowing the break to increase their advantage once again. The trio led by a maximum of four and a half minutes before the peloton started to chase in earnest. At the intermediate sprint, the break took maximum points before Sonny Colbrelli outsprinted Michael Matthews for the remaining points on offer as Mark Cavendish rode closely behind. With  to go, the break started attacking each other as Bennett accelerated off the front. Latour and Goldstein managed to bridge up to Bennett before eventually dropping him as well. At around the same time, Philippe Gilbert and Alex Aranburu attempted to attack from the peloton but  managed to mark the attacks.

With  to go, a crash on a descent took out several riders at the back of the peloton, with other riders also falling down a small ravine. All of them managed to get back up, but the crash led to the abandonment of Roger Kluge and the  duo of Simon Yates and Lucas Hamilton. Among the survivors, Tim Declercq and Søren Kragh Andersen seemed to fare the worst, with both riders finishing over 15 minutes down.  from the finish, Latour and Goldstein were brought back by the peloton, prompting an attack from Quentin Pacher a few moments later. Pacher was allowed an advantage of a minute and a half while Jan Bakelants also attacked from the peloton. Shortly afterwards, several teams attempted to split the peloton into echelons, but the winds were not strong enough to cause such splits. The sprinters' teams soon began to go to the front to prepare for a bunch sprint. In a chaotic sprint to the line, one of Cavendish's lead-out men, Davide Ballerini, managed to get a small gap after Michael Mørkøv briefly lost his wheel. Iván García Cortina soon bridged over to Ballerini with Mørkøv, Cavendish, and Jasper Philipsen on his wheel. Mørkøv successfully led out Cavendish for the win, his fourth of the race. Mørkøv managed to hold on to second place on the stage with Philipsen finishing in third. With his win, Cavendish equalled Eddy Merckx's record for the most number of Tour stage wins with 34. He also increased his lead in the points classification to 101 over Matthews. All the GC contenders finished safely in the main peloton, leaving the top ten unchanged.

Stage 14 
10 July 2021 – Carcassonne to Quillan, 

The fourteenth stage took the riders from Carcassonne to Quillan, making its debut as a Tour stage finish, with a terrain that was expected to suit a breakaway. The first few kilometres were on a false flat section before the riders tackled the third-category , a  climb with an average gradient of 5.3 percent. A long downhill segment led to the final climb of the day, the second-category . From there, the descent led to the finish in Quillan.

Following the aftermath of the crash the previous day, two more riders abandoned as Søren Kragh Andersen and Warren Barguil did not start the stage. There were several attempts to break away, but it eventually took almost  for the breakaway to be fully established.  was especially keen on having a representative in the break, with Toms Skujiņš and Julien Bernard involved in various moves. Kristian Sbaragli kicked off proceedings and built up a lead of almost two minutes before a four-man chase group soon went away in pursuit of him. The quartet managed to bridge over to Sbaragli but their advantage continued to decrease due to the constant attacking from behind. With  to go, just after the intermediate sprint, the quintet up front was eventually caught as several riders continued to attack. On the Col de Montségur, Wout Poels and Mattia Cattaneo were able to establish a gap, with Michael Woods also bridging to them soon after. A seven-man chase group including Guillaume Martin, who started the day in ninth place, also formed behind while  began to control the peloton. Near the top, Woods attacked in pursuit of the KOM points, with Poels bridging up to him and outsprinting him for the maximum points. On the descent, Cattaneo made his way back up to Woods and Poels while a group containing Pierre Rolland also attacked from the peloton. At the top of the second-category Col de la Croix des Morts, Woods outsprinted Poels for the maximum points, drawing level on points with the mountains classification leader, Nairo Quintana. With  to go, the seven-man group joined up with the trio at the front while the Rolland group made it to the front group with  left, making for a total of fourteen riders in the break.

As the break neared the top of the Côte de Galinagues, Poels outsprinted Woods for the KOM points, with the single point gained by Woods giving him the lead in the KOM competition. On the descent, Woods slipped on a curve, forcing some of his breakaway companions off-road. He would get back up but he had to spend extra energy to get to the front group. With  to go and still on the descent, Bauke Mollema attacked off the front. He gained an advantage of more than a minute over his breakaway companions ahead of the final climb of the Col de Saint-Louis. From behind,  made their way to the front of the peloton to protect Rigoberto Urán’s second place on GC. The chasing group soon began to attack each other but Mollema kept his lead at about a minute. Mollema crested the top of the climb with a lead of more than a minute over a group containing Woods, Cattaneo, Sergio Higuita, and Patrick Konrad while Martin’s group crested the top at almost a minute and a half. Mollema would go on to solo to the stage win, his second career Tour victory after his first in 2017 from a similar move on similar terrain. He crossed the line at 1' 04" ahead of Konrad and Higuita. Martin crossed the line at almost a minute and a half behind while the yellow jersey group cruised over the finish line almost seven minutes down. As a result, Martin rose to second overall at around four minutes down while Cattaneo, who finished with the first chasing group, moved into the top ten at almost ten minutes behind Tadej Pogačar, who kept the maillot jaune.

Stage 15 
11 July 2021 – Céret to Andorra la Vella (Andorra), 

The fifteenth stage took the riders outside of France for the only time in this year's Tour with the riders heading from Céret to Andorre-la-Vieille. Andorra was last visited by the Tour in 2016, when Tom Dumoulin won the summit finish to Andorra Arcalis in a stage that was marred by hailstorms. Following the descent, the road gradually went uphill towards the intermediate sprint in Olette after  of racing. From there, the descent led to the finish in Andorra la Vella.

From the start, Thomas De Gendt kicked off the attacks before being joined by seven other riders. A few moments later, a large group, including most of the challengers for the king of the mountains jersey, went off the front of the peloton. This group would eventually bridge up to the eight riders at the front, making it a 32-rider breakaway. On the road to the intermediate sprint, the breakaway split as several riders refused to work at the front, but the two breakaway groups would eventually regroup. At the intermediate sprint, Michael Matthews took maximum points to decrease his deficit in the points classification to 72. From behind, as the road began to go uphill, Nacer Bouhanni abandoned from the race as he suffered from the crash on stage 13. As the break neared the top of the first categorized climb of the day, the Montée de Mont-Louis, Michael Woods, Wout Poels, and Wout van Aert sprinted for the KOM points, with Poels taking the maximum points ahead of van Aert and Woods. Meanwhile, the -led peloton crested the top of the first climb more than nine minutes behind the break.

After a lull in the action, the break soon reached the second-category climb of Col de Puymorens, with Bruno Armirail pacing the break for most of the day. At the top, van Aert managed to outsprint Poels with Woods in third. As a result, Poels and Woods were tied at the top of the KOM competition. On the Port d'Envalira, Julien Bernard began to set a pace that began to shed riders from the break. The breakaway riders started to attack each other until Nairo Quintana established a gap  from the top. Quintana soloed to the top to get the maximum KOM points as well as the Souvenir Henri Desgrange before being caught on the descent. Van Aert took 8 points while Poels took 6 points which gave him the lead in the KOM competition. As soon as the riders reached the Col de Beixalis, Quintana accelerated once again before being caught again. David Gaudu also made an attack before Sepp Kuss launched his move  from the top of Beixalis. Only Alejandro Valverde was able to follow his move before he began to struggle following Kuss. Kuss led Valverde by around 20 seconds at the top of the Beixalis with the first chase group at about a minute and a half. Kuss maintained his gap on the descent, eventually soloing to his first Tour stage win and his team's second in this year's Tour. Valverde finished second, 23 seconds behind, while Poels led the first chase group home, 1' 15" behind.

In the GC group,  continued to control the peloton until  and  started to set a fast tempo at the Col de Puymorens. The pace sent several riders out the back and leaving most of the contenders isolated. On the descent of the Envalira, two riders in the top ten, Guillaume Martin and Mattia Cattaneo, began to get distanced and despite their best efforts, they began the climb of Beixalis at a minute down on the other contenders. On the climb's steepest section, Richard Carapaz attacked but he was marked by the other contenders. Carapaz, Jonas Vingegaard, Rigoberto Urán, and Ben O'Connor launched more attacks but Tadej Pogačar and the other contenders were able to follow each time. O'Connor and Alexey Lutsenko were distanced near the top of the Beixalis but O'Connor made it back on the descent. The GC group finished almost five minutes down on Kuss while Lutsenko ended up finishing 29 seconds further in arrears. Martin eventually lost almost four minutes while Cattaneo lost more than five minutes.

In the GC, Pogačar retained the maillot jaune with a lead of 5' 18" over Urán, who moved back up to second place. As a result of their time loss, Martin fell to ninth place, almost eight minutes down while Cattaneo fell out of the top ten at almost 15 minutes behind. Lutsenko now sits at seventh, more than seven minutes behind while Pello Bilbao, who finished with Lutsenko on the stage, moved back into the top ten, almost 11 minutes down.

Rest day 2 
12 July 2021 – Andorra la Vella (Andorra)

On the rest day, Vincenzo Nibali and Amund Grøndahl Jansen both withdrew from the race, the former to focus on the Olympics and the latter as a result of injuries sustained from crashes on the first stage.

Stage 16 
13 July 2021 – El Pas de la Casa (Andorra) to Saint-Gaudens, 

Following the second and last rest day, the riders continued through the Pyrenees and returned to France with a hilly course from El Pas de la Casa to Saint-Gaudens. The descent led to the intermediate sprint at Vic d'Oust after  of racing. After the Col de Portet-d'Aspet's technical descent, the route continued descending to the fourth-category Côte d'Aspret-Sarrat, which crested with  left in the stage. The last  of the stage ran uphill, also at an average gradient of 8.4 percent.

As soon as the flag dropped, Kasper Asgreen attacked and gained an advantage of around two minutes on the peloton. Casper Pedersen and Jasper Stuyven attempted to join Asgreen up front but they were not able to make inroads into his lead before being caught by the peloton. On the first climb of the day, Asgreen's lead began to decrease as several riders attacked from the peloton. Asgreen would soon be joined by teammate Mattia Cattaneo and 's Michał Kwiatkowski, but the trio crested the top with only a lead of half a minute over the yellow jersey group. They were eventually caught on the descent, with Christopher Juul-Jensen closing down the trio. Ahead of the intermediate sprint, Juul-Jensen went on the attack himself along with Fabien Doubey and Jan Bakelants. The trio took maximum points at the intermediate sprint while Michael Matthews and Sonny Colbrelli took 13 and 11 points, respectively, to further decrease Mark Cavendish's lead in the points classification. Both riders were part of an 11-man chasing group who tried to bridge to the trio up front while  began to control the peloton and let the break go.

On the Col de la Core, Patrick Konrad attacked from the chase group, eventually bridging up with the three riders at the front. Juul-Jensen dropped back to the chase group as Konrad led the trio at the top. From behind,  briefly worked in the peloton in a bid to protect their place in the team classification. On the descent, the trio maintained their lead at around half a minute before Konrad dropped his companions on the Col de Portet-d'Aspet. The chase group also started to split as Colbrelli and David Gaudu went off in pursuit of Konrad. Colbrelli and Gaudu were eventually caught by the chase group while Konrad soloed to the stage win. Colbrelli beat Matthews in the sprint for second, though both riders would still gain points and further decrease Cavendish's lead. In the peloton,  and Wout van Aert instigated an attack on the Côte d'Aspret-Sarrat, causing a split in the peloton; however, all the contenders made it to the front group. The yellow jersey group eventually finished almost 14 minutes down on Konrad. Apart from Guillaume Martin losing 4 seconds on the uphill sprint to the line, the top ten remained unchanged ahead of two consecutive summit finishes in the Pyrenees.

Stage 17 
14 July 2021 – Muret to Saint-Lary-Soulan (Col de Portet), 

Stage 17 saw the riders take on the first of two consecutive summit finishes with a route from Muret to the summit of the Col de Portet. The final  featured three climbs that amount to just under  of vertical climbing. The final climb featured multiple sections over 10 percent and apart from a single kilometre averaging 5 per cent, the gradient barely fell below 8 percent.

As it was Bastille Day, the French national holiday, French riders were especially eager to get into the breakaway for a chance to win the stage. After a while, a group containing Lukas Pöstlberger, Anthony Perez, Dorian Godon, and Danny van Poppel broke away from the peloton. The peloton would let the break go but Anthony Turgis and Maxime Chevalier made a last-ditch attempt to bridge to the break. Both riders managed to make it to the front group while behind, Julien Bernard also tried to attack from the peloton but he was unable to make inroads into the break's lead. As  controlled the peloton,  was dealt a blow when Steven Kruijswijk abandoned the Tour after suffering from illness during the rest day. The break was allowed to gain an advantage of around eight and a half minutes before  and  began to set a steady tempo in the peloton for their respective contenders, Michael Woods and Nairo Quintana, in the mountains classification ahead of the day's climbs. At the intermediate sprint, the leading sextet took maximum points before Michael Matthews finished ahead of Mark Cavendish to decrease his deficit to the Manxman to 36 points.

The break soon reached the first climb of the day, the Col de Peyresourde, with a lead of eight minutes over the peloton. Their advantage began to rapidly decrease while Quintana and his teammate Élie Gesbert attacked from the peloton, with Wout Poels following to defend his lead in the mountains classification. Pierre Latour managed to bridge up to the trio as the four riders gained a lead of about 40 seconds on the peloton. However,  started to set a furious pace that brought back the quartet, but not before Latour left the three other riders behind. Turgis led the break over the top of the Peyresourde, almost three and a half minutes over Latour and around four minutes over the peloton. The break increased their lead to four and a half minutes ahead of the second climb, the Col de Val Louron-Azet, while the peloton caught Latour ahead of the climb. On the climb itself, Perez, Godon, and Turgis dropped their breakaway companions before Perez went solo off the front. Turgis continually lost time while Godon managed to pace his efforts to stay close to Perez. Pöstlberger, van Poppel, and Chevalier were caught by the peloton before reaching the top. Perez took the maximum points while Godon rode closely behind. The peloton reached the top at just under four minutes behind Perez, with Poels sprinting to the top to add four points to his mountains classification lead.

On the descent, Godon bridged up to Perez and the duo worked together to maintain a four-minute advantage over the peloton. At the bottom of the Col du Portet, Godon accelerated but he was unable to drop Perez. Perez counterattacked further up the climb, dropping Godon in the process. Behind in the peloton,  continued to set a fast tempo, sweeping up Turgis and shedding riders out the back; among their initial victims were Enric Mas and Guillaume Martin, two riders in the top ten on GC. At around the same time, Pello Bilbao attacked from the yellow jersey group but he would be caught shortly thereafter. With  to go, the race leader, Tadej Pogačar, made his first attack, catching Perez and bringing with him the  duo of Richard Carapaz and Jonathan Castroviejo, Jonas Vingegaard, Rigoberto Urán, and Ben O'Connor. Pogačar made another attack a few seconds later and only Carapaz, Vingegaard, and Urán could follow him. A few moments later, Urán was dropped and would continue to lose time until the finish. Towards the top, Pogačar and Vingegaard worked together to increase their gap while Carapaz continued to sit on their wheels. From the first chase group, which included Urán, O'Connor, and Wilco Kelderman, David Gaudu attempted to bridge to the front group but he would not get close to the trio. With  to go, Carapaz surged, dropping Vingegaard while Pogačar immediately followed the move. Vingegaard slowly paced himself back, setting up a three-man sprint for the stage win. With  to go, Pogačar made one final attack to take his second stage win of this year's Tour, his first while wearing the maillot jaune. Vingegaard passed Carapaz to take second, 3 seconds behind. Gaudu finished fourth, 1' 19" behind while the other contenders crossed the line in ones and twos. O'Connor, Kelderman, and Bilbao lost around a minute and a half while Urán lost almost two minutes. Mas finished two and a half minutes behind while Lutsenko and Martin lost 2' 53" and 3' 39", respectively.

In the GC, Pogačar strengthened his hold on the maillot jaune with a lead of 5' 39" over Vingegaard, who moved up to second. Carapaz moved into a podium position, 5' 43" behind Pogačar while Urán dropped to fourth at more than seven minutes behind. Apart from Lutsenko and Mas switching places, the other riders in the top ten maintained their positions but at a further distance from the maillot jaune.

Stage 18 
15 July 2021 – Pau to Luz Ardiden, 

The mountainous eighteenth stage featured the last chance for the pure climbers to improve their GC positions and make a difference ahead of the individual time trial in two days. From the start in Pau, riders travelled gradually uphill to the intermediate sprint at Pouzac after , with the two fourth-category climbs along the way. The route continued more noticeably uphill after Pouzac until riders reached Sainte-Marie-de-Campan at the foot of the hors catégorie Col du Tourmalet.

As soon as the flag dropped, Matej Mohorič, Sean Bennett, and Christopher Juul-Jensen immediately went off the front while Cyril Barthe tried to bridge up to the trio, albeit unsuccessfully. The trio attained a gap of a minute before the attacks started behind. After a while, Julian Alaphilippe tried to attack but just before he was supposed to get caught by the peloton, Pierre-Luc Périchon attacked and began to pace with him. With  to go, both riders would eventually make it to the front group, with the -led peloton at around a minute and a half behind. The break was not allowed to gain an advantage of more than 1' 45" as the peloton kept the break in check. As the peloton reached the second climb of the day,  attempted to split the peloton to drop the points classification leader, Mark Cavendish. Although a large group containing Sonny Colbrelli and Michael Matthews managed to get a gap, the peloton rejoined at the top of the climb with Cavendish hanging on near the back. After the break took maximum points, Cavendish was successfully led out by Michael Mørkøv to add two more points to his lead, as Mørkøv finished ahead of Matthews. Just after the intermediate sprint,  attempted to break away with three of their riders along with Dan Martin and Davide Ballerini but they would be caught shortly afterwards. Ahead of the Col du Tourmalet, Pierre Rolland attacked together with Juul-Jensen but the latter would be dropped before the climb.

On the climb itself, the break split, with Mohorič and Alaphilippe the only surviving riders from the original break. In the chase group at around 40 seconds behind, Rolland was soon joined by Pierre Latour, Kenny Elissonde, and Valentin Madouas. Further up the climb, the quartet were joined by Madouas's teammate, David Gaudu, Ruben Guerreiro, and the  duo of Ion Izagirre and Omar Fraile. Nairo Quintana and Miguel Ángel López also attempted to attack but both riders were swallowed up by the peloton. At this point,  started to set a faster tempo in the peloton, rapidly decreasing the break's advantage. The chase group, apart from Rolland who was dropped, soon bridged up to Mohorič and Alaphilippe while the peloton was less than a minute down. The lead group soon began to shed riders until only Latour and Gaudu were left at the front. From behind, Rigoberto Urán began to struggle as he lost contact at the back of the peloton. Near the top, king of the mountains leader Wout Poels and Michael Woods attacked from the peloton as they attempted to take more points for the KOM competition. Latour was first over the top of the Tourmalet, taking the Souvenir Jacques Goddet in the process. Poels managed to take 10 points at the top while Woods took 6 points. Poels increased his tally to 88 points, 16 points ahead of Woods who moved up to virtual second in the KOM competition. The peloton crossed the summit at a minute behind while Urán was a further minute and a half in arrears.

On the descent, Gaudu immediately distanced Latour as the latter struggled going down the mountain. Latour was immediately caught by a chase group consisting of Poels, Guerreiro, and Fraile.  kept Gaudu at around a minute while also swallowing up the chase group near the foot of Luz Ardiden. Gaudu continued to lose time until he started the climb with a lead of 20 seconds. With  left, Pogačar launched his attack, followed closely by Richard Carapaz, Enric Mas, and the  duo of Jonas Vingegaard and Sepp Kuss. Kuss soon began to pace the group until the final kilometre while behind in the chase group containing the other contenders, Dan Martin attacked as he tried to bridge to the yellow jersey group. In the final kilometre, Mas accelerated off the front, but he was immediately marked by Pogačar, Vingegaard, and Carapaz. The four riders soon started to look at each other until Mas launched another attack. He managed to build a small gap, but Pogačar closed him down before attacking as well. Carapaz and Vingegaard tried to follow him, but Pogačar gradually increased his gap, eventually soloing to his second successive stage win and his third in this year's Tour. Vingegaard outsprinted Carapaz to take second place on the stage, two seconds behind. Mas held on to finish fourth at 13 seconds down while the other contenders finished around half a minute to a minute down. Urán ended up losing almost nine minutes on the day. As a result of Pogačar's stage win, he took 40 points at the top of Luz Ardiden, taking the lead in the KOM competition by 19 points. With only two points left on offer for the rest of the Tour, Pogačar effectively clinched the mountains classification pending his completion of the race.

In the GC, Pogačar retained the maillot jaune, slightly extending his lead to 5' 45" over Vingegaard. Carapaz retained the last spot on the podium, almost six minutes down and six seconds behind Vingegaard. Due to Urán losing time, all the other riders in the top ten moved up a spot while Urán held on to tenth, at more than 16 minutes behind Pogačar.

Stage 19 
16 July 2021 – Mourenx to Libourne, 

The nineteenth stage was a transition stage from Mourenx to Libourne. The stage started on a short descent before the riders tackled the sole fourth-category climb of the day, the Côte de Bareille, a  climb with an average gradient of 5.3 percent. After the climb, the course featured rolling terrain until the intermediate sprint, situated at the top of an uncategorized climb in Saint-Sever, after  of racing. From there, the stage was mostly flat apart from several lumps in the final .

Only 142 riders started the stage as Michael Woods and Miguel Ángel López left the Tour to focus on the Olympics. A few moments after the flag dropped, a massive crash took place, taking down several riders but no one was seriously hurt. The crash split the peloton into several groups while a group containing Julien Bernard, Franck Bonnamour, Simon Clarke, Matej Mohorič, Jonas Rutsch, and Georg Zimmermann broke away from the peloton. After a regrouping in the peloton, the six-man group built a lead of four and a half minutes before  began to chase them down. At the intermediate sprint, the sextet took maximum points while behind in the peloton, Michael Matthews and Sonny Colbrelli took 9 and 8 points, respectively. Mark Cavendish managed to take 6 points as his lead in the points classification decreased to 35 points. 

After the intermediate sprint,  stopped working in the peloton as several riders attempted to break away. Eventually, a 20-man group detached themselves and built a lead of around a minute over the peloton. After their lead over the peloton was brought down to around 20 seconds, the chasing group started to split and began to slowly build their advantage. Several riders continued to attack, shedding riders from the break and splitting the group in two after an attack from Christophe Laporte. With  to go, after an unsuccessful attack from Nils Politt, Mohorič launched an attack and immediately built a gap. Laporte tried to bridge up to him, but Mohorič gradually increased his advantage. The chase group was unable to work together as they began to attack each other. Mohorič eventually soloed to his second stage win in this year's Tour, almost a minute ahead of Laporte, Casper Pedersen, and Mike Teunissen. The top ten remained unchanged ahead of the penultimate stage individual time trial.

Stage 20 
17 July 2021 – Libourne to Saint-Émilion,  (ITT)

The penultimate stage of the Tour featured the race's second individual time trial, with the riders travelling from Libourne to Saint-Émilion. The course was similar to the first time trial on Stage 5 with a rolling terrain greeted the riders on the road. The first intermediate time check was situated at Pomerol after  of racing. After , there was a short  uphill ramp with an average gradient of around 4.5 percent. There was another short ramp towards the second intermediate time check at Montagne after . The final few kilometres of the course featured a false flat towards the finish line in Saint-Émilion.

As is customary for an individual time trial, the riders set off in reverse order of their GC places. As a result, Tim Declercq was the first rider off the start ramp. The first riders to set fast times were Mikkel Bjerg and Stefan Bissegger. Bjerg set a time of 36' 45", putting him in the hot seat, but Bissegger set faster times at both intermediate time checks by slim margins. Bissegger eventually beat Bjerg's time by eight seconds. He would stay in the hot seat before Kasper Asgreen began to threaten Bissegger's time. Asgreen was six seconds up at the first time check before extending his lead to 23 seconds at the second time check. He maintained his advantage to the finish, setting a time of 36' 14" and becoming the first rider to average  on the day. The European time trial champion, Stefan Küng, soon went off the start ramp as one of the favorites for the win. Küng started out fast, beating Asgreen's time by 10 seconds at the first time check. He started to slow by the second time check as his advantage was down to 0.25 seconds. Küng eventually had to settle for a time of 36' 31", 17 seconds slower than Asgreen. Asgreen's time stood for a long time until Wout van Aert started his ride. He set the fastest times at both intermediate time checks before setting a time of 35' 53", the only time on the day under 36 minutes. His time stood for the rest of the day as he won his second stage of this year's Tour.

The focus soon shifted to the top ten riders as there were several spots still up for grabs. Pello Bilbao, sitting in ninth on GC, was only 1' 02" behind Guillaume Martin and was expected to overhaul the Frenchman. However, Bilbao struggled with the placement of his radio and ended up setting a time of 39' 06". Martin managed to limit his losses to 31 seconds as he retained his eighth place on GC. In the battle for sixth, Enric Mas had a lead of 1' 11" over Alexey Lutsenko, with the latter recognized as a superior time trialist. Lutsenko eventually set a time of 37' 51" while Mas finished with a time of 38' 22", which meant that Mas protected his sixth place. Meanwhile, in fourth place, Ben O'Connor had a lead of only 32 seconds over Wilco Kelderman, who was recognized as the better time trialist. However, O'Connor was five seconds faster at the first time check. Although he lost time for the rest of the course, O'Connor only ended up losing 21 seconds to Kelderman and thus kept his fourth place on GC. Lastly, Jonas Vingegaard was only six seconds up on Richard Carapaz in the battle for second, with the Dane recognized as the faster time trialist. Vingegaard ended up setting the third best time of 36' 25" to keep his second place while Carapaz lost more than a minute and a half to the Dane. The last rider off the start ramp was Tadej Pogačar, the maillot jaune. With a lead of 5' 45" over Vingegaard, Pogačar could afford to ride more conservatively and avoid taking any risks. The Slovenian eventually set a time of 36' 50", the eighth best time on the day and effectively sealed his second consecutive Tour title ahead of the procession to Paris.

Stage 21 
18 July 2021 – Chatou to Paris (Champs-Élysées), 

The last stage of the race featured the traditional sprint finish in Paris on the Champs-Élysées. The first  featured a lumpy parcours with a single fourth-category climb, the Côte des Grès, on the way. The riders reached Paris and passed through the finish line for the first time after . The circuit was slightly altered as the finish line was moved  further from the last right-hand bend and closer towards the Arc de Triomphe.

Prior to the stage, there was one non-starter as Jakob Fuglsang left the Tour due to sickness following the ITT. Much like every year, the first half of the stage was a celebratory procession with no one attacking prior to reaching Paris.  led the field onto the first passage through the finish line. Immediately afterwards, 13 riders went off the front of the peloton, but the break was quickly shut down. After a regrouping, a three-man group composed of Stefan Bissegger, Harry Sweeny, and Casper Pedersen broke away from the peloton. They took maximum points at the intermediate sprint while behind, Mark Cavendish was successfully led out by Michael Mørkøv to add two more points to his lead for the green jersey. The break was joined by Patrick Konrad while Pedersen was soon called back by his team.

The peloton kept the break under control, not letting them get a lead of more than 30 seconds. The front trio was eventually caught with around  remaining, just inside the final lap, as the sprinters' teams set their riders up for the final sprint. Jasper Philipsen tried to come around him while Cavendish was boxed in just behind van Aert. Van Aert held both riders off to win the sprint, his second consecutive win and third win in this year's race, while Philipsen and Cavendish finished second and third, respectively. Van Aert added a sprint win to his mountain stage win on stage 11 and his time trial win the previous day. Tadej Pogačar finished safely in the bunch to confirm his second consecutive Tour title. The traditional prize-giving commenced shortly afterwards.

Notes

References 

2021 Tour de France
Tour de France stages